James Yorke Bramston (15 March 1763 – 11 July 1836) was an English-born bishop of the Roman Catholic Church. He served as Vicar Apostolic of the London District from 1827 until his death in 1836.

Born in Oundle, Northamptonshire, Bramston was educated at Oundle School and Lincoln's Inn, where he studied for nearly four years under the Roman Catholic conveyancer Charles Butler, and became a lawyer.

Following his conversion to Catholicism in 1790, he studied theology at the English College, Lisbon and was ordained a priest in 1801. He then worked as a missionary in the apostolic vicariates of the Midland District and the London District, of which he became vicar general in 1812.

On 4 February 1823, Bramston was appointed Coadjutor Vicar Apostolic of the London District and Titular Bishop of Usula by Pope Pius VII. He received his episcopal consecration on the following 29 June from Bishop William Poynter, with Bishops Peter Collingridge, O.F.M., and Peter Augustine Baines, O.S.B., serving as co-consecrators. He succeeded Bishop Poynter as Vicar Apostolic of the London District upon the latter's death on 26 November 1827.

In 1834, in his private chapel in London, Bramston consecrated as a bishop the Benedictine Bede Polding, vicar apostolic of New Holland, Van Diemen's Land and the adjoining islands,

By 1835, London contained 16 churches, 35 priests, and 150,000 Catholics.

Bramston died at age 73 on 11 July 1836. His funeral Mass was held at St. Mary's Church in Moorfields, where he was buried; his heart, however, was interred at St Edmund's College, Ware.

References

External links
 

1763 births
1836 deaths
Apostolic vicars of England and Wales
People from Oundle
Converts to Roman Catholicism from Anglicanism
19th-century Roman Catholic bishops in England